Behold is a statue designed by sculptor Patrick Morelli. Dedicated in 1990 by Coretta Scott King, the statue is located in front of Ebenezer Baptist Church, in the Martin Luther King Jr. National Historical Park.

History 
The statue was dedicated on January 11, 1990, by Coretta Scott King, the widowed wife of Martin Luther King Jr. The statue was an unsolicited gift to The King Center, and initially the center had concerns over the work's artistic merit. The piece is located in a small park near Ebenezer Baptist Church. The statue is based on an African ritual of lifting a newborn to the skies. It depicts an allegorical figure of Kunta Kinte lifting his newborn towards the sky. The statue is a popular spot for photographers. The statue itself is made of bronze, with a granite pedestal inscribed with the phrase:

Second casting
A second casting of Behold is located at Essex County College in Newark, New Jersey. The piece was commissioned by the New Jersey Martin Luther King, Jr. Commemorative Commission, a government agency within the New Jersey Department of State). It was dedicated in a ceremony led by Mayor Sharpe James in 1990.

See also 

 1990 in art

References

External links 
 

1990 establishments in Georgia (U.S. state)
1990 sculptures
Bronze sculptures in Georgia (U.S. state)
Martin Luther King Jr. National Historic Site and Preservation District
Memorials to Martin Luther King Jr.
Monuments and memorials in Georgia (U.S. state)
Outdoor sculptures in Georgia (U.S. state)
Roots: The Saga of an American Family
Statues in Atlanta
Sculptures of African Americans
Statues of fictional characters
Sculptures of children in the United States
Sculptures of men in Georgia
Public art in Newark, New Jersey